Linden Stephens (born March 21, 1995) is an American football cornerback for the Seattle Sea Dragons of the XFL. He played college football at Cincinnati and signed with the New Orleans Saints as an undrafted free agent in 2018. He has also been a member of several other NFL teams.

Professional career

New Orleans Saints
Stephens signed with the New Orleans Saints as an undrafted free agent on May 4, 2018. He was waived by the Saints on August 31, 2018 during final roster cuts.

Los Angeles Rams
Stephens was signed to the Los Angeles Rams' practice squad on October 3, 2018. He was released on October 16.

Denver Broncos
Stephens was signed to the Denver Broncos practice squad on November 21, 2018 and stayed with the team for the remainder of his rookie season. He was cut by the Broncos at the end of training camp going into the 2019 season.

Seattle Seahawks
Stephens was signed to the Seattle Seahawks practice squad on September 25, 2019.

Miami Dolphins
The Miami Dolphins signed Stephens off the Seahawks practice squad on December 7, 2019.

On April 18, 2020, Stephens was waived by the Dolphins.

Seattle Seahawks (second stint)
Stephens was claimed off waivers by the Seattle Seahawks on April 21, 2020. He was waived on September 6, 2020, and signed to the practice squad the next day. Following the season ending injuries of multiple players after the team's week 2 victory over the New England Patriots, Stephens was promoted onto the main roster on September 23, 2020.

Washington Football Team
Stephens signed with the Washington Football Team on May 5, 2021. He was waived on August 31, 2021.

Baltimore Ravens
On September 21, 2021, Stephens signed with the Baltimore Ravens practice squad. He was released on October 4, 2021.

Pittsburgh Steelers
On October 13, 2021, Stephens was signed to the Pittsburgh Steelers practice squad. He signed a reserve/future contract with the Steelers on January 18, 2022.

On August 30, 2022, Stephens was waived by the Steelers.

Seattle Sea Dragons 
On November 17, 2022, Stephens was drafted by the Seattle Sea Dragons of the XFL.

References

External links
Cincinnati Bearcats bio

1995 births
Living people
American football defensive backs
Baltimore Ravens players
Cincinnati Bearcats football players
Denver Broncos players
Los Angeles Rams players
Miami Dolphins players
New Orleans Saints players
People from Euclid, Ohio
Pittsburgh Steelers players
Players of American football from Ohio
Seattle Sea Dragons players
Seattle Seahawks players
Sportspeople from Cuyahoga County, Ohio
Washington Football Team players